Marco António Miranda Tábuas (born 29 October 1976) is a Portuguese former professional footballer who played as a goalkeeper.

He began his career at Vitória Setúbal, and went on to make 156 first team appearances (of which 110 were in the Primeira Liga) for the club after making his debut in October 1997. He was loaned out to Desportivo Beja for the 1996–97 season, where he made 12 appearances. He was promoted twice out of the Segunda Liga with Vitória Setúbal, in 2000–01 and 2003–04, and was an unused substitute as they won the Taça de Portugal in 2005, and finished as runners-up in the Supertaça Cândido de Oliveira in 2005 and the Taça de Portugal in 2006; he also played in the 2006 Supertaça Cândido de Oliveira, as Vitória Setúbal lost 3–0 to Porto. He left the club in 2008, and went on to spend the 2008–09 season with Torreense and the 2009–10 season with Aljustrelense in the Segunda Divisão. After retiring as a player he became a goalkeeping coach.

Playing career
Tábuas came through the youth system at Vitória Setúbal. He was loaned out to Desportivo Beja of the Segunda Divisão de Honra (second tier) for the 1996–97 season. He was sent off on his first team debut on 13 October, after receiving two yellow cards in a 3–2 defeat to Varzim at the Estádio do Varzim SC. He went on to play a total of 12 games for Beja. He made his first team debut for Vitória Setúbal on 26 October 1997, in a 4–2 defeat at Varzim in the fourth round of the Taça de Portugal. He made his Primeira Divisão (first tier) debut for the club on 20 September 1998, in a 1–1 draw with Beira-Mar at the Estádio Mário Duarte. He went on to play a total of 28 league and six cup games in the 1998–99 season.

He featured 27 times in the 1999–2000 relegation campaign, and played once in the UEFA Cup, a 7–0 defeat to A.S. Roma at the Stadio Olimpico on 16 September. He played 21 league games in the 2000–01 season, as Vitória Setúbal won promotion at the first attempt after securing a third-place finish. However, he played only 11 times in the 2001–02 season, and was sent off after receiving two yellow cards in a 3–2 win over Santa Clara on 14 April.  He featured 19 times in the 2002–03 relegation campaign, and was sent off for the third and final time in his career in a 2–0 defeat by Paços de Ferreira on 4 May; he was shown a red card on 73 minutes despite being an unused substitute. Vitória Setúbal again won promotion at the first attempt in 2003–04, though Tábuas played only three league games as the club secured the second automatic promotion place.

He played a total of 20 matches in the 2004–05 season, and was an unused substitute at the club won the Taça de Portugal with a 2–1 victory over league champions Benfica. He was also an unused substitute in the 2005 Supertaça Cândido de Oliveira at the Estádio Algarve, where Benfica achieved some revenge over Vitória Setúbal with a 1–0 victory. He was appointed as the club's second captain, and spoke in defence of the club after a financial crisis meant the players considered strike action after wages went unpaid at the Estádio do Bonfim for months on end. He played 11 games in the 2005–06 season, and was an unused substitute in the 2006 Taça de Portugal Final at the Estádio Nacional, as Porto defeated Vitória Setúbal 1–0. He started the 2006 Supertaça Cândido de Oliveira match at the Estádio Dr. Magalhães Pessoa, as new signing Nikola Milojević was unable to secure a work permit in time; Vitória Setúbal were beaten 3–0 by Porto. He went on to feature in just four further matches in the 2006–07 and 2007–08 seasons, including a second appearance in the UEFA Cup, as Vitória Setúbal lost 3–0 at home to Heerenveen on 14 September 2006.

In July 2008, Tábuas was released by Vitória Setúbal and joined Torreense in the Segunda Divisão - Série D (third tier). He made 29 league and cup appearances in the 2008–09 campaign, before he returned to Alentejo to play for Aljustrelense. He played 15 Segunda Divisão Zona Sul games in the 2009–10 season, and announced his retirement at the end of the campaign.

Coaching career
Tábuas coached at Gouveia from July 2014 to June 2015, and then at Eléctrico from July 2015 to April 2016. In July 2016, he was appointed as goalkeeping coach at English League One club Port Vale by manager Bruno Ribeiro. He departed Vale Park after Ribeiro resigned in December 2016.

Career statistics

Honours
Vitória Setúbal
Segunda Liga second-place promotion: 2003–04; third-place promotion: 2000–01
Supertaça Cândido de Oliveira runner-up: 2005, 2006
Taça de Portugal: 2005; runner-up: 2006

References

1976 births
Living people
People from Moita
Sportspeople from Setúbal District
Portuguese footballers
Association football goalkeepers
Vitória F.C. players
C.D. Beja players
S.C.U. Torreense players
Primeira Liga players
Liga Portugal 2 players
Segunda Divisão players
Association football coaches
Association football goalkeeping coaches
Port Vale F.C. non-playing staff
Portuguese expatriate sportspeople in England